Joseph Vincent François Courdouan (7 March 1810, Toulon - 8 December 1893, Toulon) was a French painter who specialized in maritime scenes.

Biography 

His father was a farrier and veterinarian. He began his artistic studies at the age of twelve with the local artist Pierre Letuaire. Later, he spent some time at the "École des Beaux-Arts de la Marine", a small school under the direction of the naval sculptor Jacques-Félix Brun. In 1829, he went to Paris where he studied engraving and worked in the studios of the painter Paulin Guérin, who was also originally from Toulon.

After completing his studies, he returned home and, in 1833, became a member of the Académie du Var, a group that promotes the arts and sciences in that region and can boast of many prominent members; including André-Marie Ampère, Louis Lumière and Georges-Eugène Haussmann. Three years later, he was back in Paris with his first exhibition at the Salon, where he continued to exhibit, winning a Third Class Medal in 1838 for his watercolors and pastels.

First successes
In 1840, he began accepting students; these included the etcher Charles Meryon. He travelled to Naples in 1844. The following year, he turned more to oil painting and exhibited widely throughout France, notably in Lyon. In 1847, he visited Algeria and achieved a Gold Medal at the Salon in 1848 for his painting "Battle of the Romulus". This recognition was a major factor in his receiving a Professorship at the "École de la Marine de Toulon" in 1849. Three years later, he was awarded the Légion d’Honneur.

The following year, at the age of 53, he married one of his students.

He continued to exhibit and travel widely for many years (including a trip to Egypt in 1866). He had his last showing at the Salon in 1883 and his last major exhibitions at Hyères and Aix-en-Provence in 1886. He died in the same house where he had been born.

References

Further reading 
 Jean-Roger Soubiran, Autour de Vincent Courdouan: 1810-1893, Musée d'Art Toulon (1993)  
 Brigitte Gaillard et al., Catalogue de l'exposition Vincent Courdouan, held from 27 October 2000 to 4 February 2001 at the Musée d'Art de Toulon. 
 Brigitte Gaillard, L'Algérie et l'Egypte: Vincent Courdouan et ses contemporains provençaux, exhibition catalog, Musée d'Art Toulon (2010)

External links 

 Biographical sketch and appreciation @ Carnet d'escale
 ArtNet: more works by Courdouan

1810 births
1893 deaths
19th-century French painters
French male painters
French marine artists
Artists from Toulon
19th-century French male artists